Pokémon Diamond and Pearl is a 2006 Nintendo DS role-playing video game. This may also refer to:

Pokémon: Diamond and Pearl, an anime. See Pokémon the Series: Diamond and Pearl.
Keitai Denjū Telefang, a series of video games for the Game Boy Color; pirate translations name one version Pokémon Diamond
Pokémon Diamond and Pearl Adventure!, a manga.